Inka Pallanka (also spelled Incapallanca, Inkapallanka) is a mountain in the Andes of Peru, about  high. It is situated in the Ayacucho Region, Lucanas Province, on the border of the districts of Carmen Salcedo and Pukyu. By the local people the mountain is venerated as an apu.

The archaeological site of Quriwayrachina lies near Inka Pallanka.

References 

Mountains of Peru
Mountains of Ayacucho Region